Kabakush (Qabıqqıwış) is a rural locality (a selo) and the administrative centre of Kabakushsky Selsoviet, Sterlibashevsky District, Bashkortostan, Russia. The population was 589 as of 2010. There are 14 streets.

Geography 
Kabakush is located 23 km south of Sterlibashevo (the district's administrative centre) by road. Novy Mir is the nearest rural locality.

References 

Rural localities in Sterlibashevsky District